"Sayonara" is the 7th single from the Japanese band Orange Range. "Sayonara" was used as theme song for the TBD drama Teppan Shōjo Akane!!. The single also had two other songs used in various Japanese ads. People believe this single says farewell to the old band with Kazuhito "Katchan", and hello to the band's future. The video shows depressing scenes of a woman who lost someone dear, and how he watches over her, while at the end, is happy that she'll always love and never forget him and says "Sayonara" to her and vanishes. The man might have been her husband or boyfriend. He smiles at the end of the video when she is walking with a new husband or boyfriend, and continues to watch over her. Part of Kizuna is dedicated to Kat-chan.

Track list
 "Sayonara"
 "Yarisugi Manbō" (Yarisugi マンボウ)
 "Lonely Fighter" (ロンリーファイター)

Charts

Oricon chart (Japan)

Orange Range songs
2006 singles
Japanese television drama theme songs
2006 songs
Sony Music Entertainment Japan singles